Metropolitan Herman (born Joseph Swaiko, 1 February 1932 – 6 September 2022) was the primate of the Orthodox Church in America (OCA). As the head of the OCA, he was the Archbishop of Washington and New York, and Metropolitan of All America and Canada.

Biography
Joseph Swaiko was born  in Bairdford, Pennsylvania, to Wasil and Helen Heridish Swaiko. He had nine siblings, all born between 1919 and 1933.

He completed his primary and secondary education in the West Deer Township school system, and enrolled in Robert Morris College. He graduated from Robert Morris with an associate degree in secretarial science. Upon graduation, he served as a company clerk in the United States Army Adjutant General's Corps, and was stationed in Labrador.

After his honorable discharge from the army in 1959, he enrolled at Saint Tikhon's Orthodox Theological Seminary. There, in 1961, he was appointed personal secretary to bishop Kiprian (Borisevich).

Subsequently, he served on the seminary's administrative staff and was an instructor of Church Slavonic. He also served as Rector of St. John the Baptist Church in Dundaff and Sts. Peter and Paul Church in Union Dale, Pennsylvania.

On , Herman was elevated to the rank of Igumen and was named Deputy Abbot of St. Tikhon of Zadonsk Orthodox Monastery. In , Herman was raised to the rank of Archimandrite.

On , he was consecrated Bishop of Wilkes-Barre in his Cathedral Church of the Holy Resurrection and assigned as auxiliary bishop of the Philadelphia and Pennsylvania Archdiocese.

In 1994, he was elevated to the rank of Archbishop. From May to September 2001, Archbishop Herman served as the temporary administrator of the OCA, while Metropolitan Theodosius was on a medical leave of absence.

Election to Metropolitan
On , Metropolitan Theodosius (who had suffered a series of strokes) submitted a petition to the Holy Synod of the OCA requesting his retirement.  The Holy Synod granted his request and announced an election for his replacement to be held on July 22, at the OCA's Thirteenth All-American Council in Orlando.

No candidate received the required two-thirds majority during the first round of voting, which necessitated a second round. During the second round, Bishop Seraphim of Ottawa and Canada received the majority of votes, but again not the required two-thirds. Subsequently, the Holy Synod decided to elect Archbishop Herman (Metropolitan Theodosius was selected in a similar manner in 1977, having not received a two-thirds majority of votes).

After numerous complaints of financial improprieties were lodged with the Holy Synod of the OCA, a Special Investigating Committee was established in  under the chairmanship of Bishop Benjamin of the West. (see Financial scandal in the Orthodox Church in America). The final report was issued in November 2008.  It detailed numerous dubious transactions and poor accounting practices. It recommended the replacement of Metropolitan Herman. Aware of this coming recommendation, Metropolitan Herman retired in September 2008.

Later life and death
Following his retirement Herman lived in a small residence on the grounds of St. Tikhon's Monastery in Pennsylvania where he died on 6 September 2022 aged 90 following a long illness.

References

External links
 

1932 births
2022 deaths
20th-century American clergy
20th-century Christian monks
20th-century Eastern Orthodox clergy
21st-century American clergy
21st-century Eastern Orthodox archbishops
Military personnel from Pennsylvania
People from West Deer Township, Pennsylvania
Primates of the Orthodox Church in America
Religious leaders from Pennsylvania